Cemal Öner (born 1 November 1966) is a Turkish boxer. He competed in the men's bantamweight event at the 1984 Summer Olympics.

References

1966 births
Living people
Turkish male boxers
Olympic boxers of Turkey
Boxers at the 1984 Summer Olympics
Place of birth missing (living people)
Bantamweight boxers
20th-century Turkish people